Arthur Percy Eccles was a professional rugby league and association footballer who played in the 1900s. He also played one season of association football for Bradford F.C..

Playing career

Rugby league
Percy Eccles was the league's top try-scorer in the 1906–07 season with 41-tries.

Percy Eccles won a cap for England while at Halifax in 1908 against New Zealand, and won a cap for Great Britain while at Halifax in 1908 against New Zealand.

Association football
He played association football for Bradford F.C. in 1908 before returning to his "first love" of rugby in 1909.

Death
Eccles died in Halifax General Hospital on 4 October 1955, aged 72. His funeral took place in St Jude's Church, Halifax, and he was cremated at Scholemoor Crematorium, Bradford.

References

External links
Search for "Percy Eccles" at britishnewspaperarchive.co.uk

1883 births
1955 deaths
Bradford F.C. players
England national rugby league team players
English footballers
English rugby league players
Great Britain national rugby league team players
Halifax R.L.F.C. players
Rugby league wingers
Association footballers not categorized by position